Ivar Jakobsen (born 5 January 1954) is a Danish former cyclist. He competed in the team pursuit event at the 1976 Summer Olympics.

References

External links
 

1954 births
Living people
Danish male cyclists
Olympic cyclists of Denmark
Cyclists at the 1976 Summer Olympics
Sportspeople from Frederiksberg